Piper darienense is a flowering plant in the family Piperaceae. It is called Duermeboca in Panama. In El Chocó, the plant is used as a fish poison. Cuna, an indigenous people of Panama and Colombia, call it Kana, and they use it in a bath, for snakebites and colds.

References

Flora of Bolivia
Flora of Peru
Flora of Panama
Flora of Colombia
Flora of Nicaragua
Flora of Costa Rica